Caroline Ladagnous (born 22 September 1988) is a French female rugby union player. She represented  at the 2010 Women's Rugby World Cup. She has been named in the squad to the 2014 Women's Rugby World Cup

Ladagnous was named in the French women's sevens team for the 2016 Summer Olympics.

She is the sister of racing cyclist Mathieu Ladagnous.

References

External links 

 
 
 
 

1988 births
Living people
French female rugby union players
Place of birth missing (living people)
Rugby sevens players at the 2016 Summer Olympics
Olympic rugby sevens players of France
France international rugby sevens players
France international women's rugby sevens players